Radu Albot was the defending champion but chose not to defend his title.

Ilya Ivashka won the title after defeating Nikola Milojević 6–4, 6–3 in the final.

Seeds

Draw

Finals

Top half

Bottom half

References
Main Draw
Qualifying Draw

Fergana Challenger - Men's Singles
2017 Men's Singles